Young Island is one of the smallest islands of Grenadines and part of the state St. Vincent and the Grenadines. The name goes back to the former British Governor of St. Vincent William Young.

Geography 
Young Island belongs to the Grenadines, an archipelago of the Lesser Antilles, and administratively belongs to the Saint George Parish.

Traffic and tourism 
Young Island can only be reached by a small ferry that travels regularly to and from St. Vincent. The island is privately owned, and prior to 1974 work began on building a luxury holiday resort. Currently, the settlement includes 29 cottages.

References

Islands of Saint Vincent and the Grenadines
Private islands of Saint Vincent and the Grenadines